Jestyn is a given name, a variant of Justin, and may refer to:

 Iestyn ap Gwrgant (1014 – 1093), ruler of Morgannwg
 Jestyn Murphy (born 1996), Canadian curler
 Jestyn Philipps, 2nd Viscount St Davids (1917-1991), British peer

See also
 Jestin (disambiguation)

Unisex given names